John or Jack Butterworth may refer to:

John-Henry Butterworth (born 1976), American screenwriter
John Butterworth (minister) (1727–1803), English Baptist minister
John Butterworth (cricketer) (1905–1941), English cricketer
Jack Butterworth, Baron Butterworth (1918–2003), British lawyer and first Vice-Chancellor of the University of Warwick
 Jon Butterworth, British physicist
William John Butterworth (1801–1856), British colonel who governed the Straits Settlements in the 1840s and 1850s
Mike Butterworth (John Michael Butterworth, 1924–1986), British comic book writer

See also
 Jonathan Butterworth (disambiguation)